The 2007 election to the Grand Council was held in the canton of Vaud, Switzerland, on 11 March 2007.  All 150 members of the Grand Council were elected for four-year terms, a reduction of 30 from the size of the previous legislature.

The Social Democratic Party secured the largest number of seats once again; although it lost seven seats, its percent share of the seats remained constant.  Despite the reduction in the size of the legislature, the populist Swiss People's Party and Green Party both managed to gain seats.

The main losers were the two classical liberal parties, the Free Democrats and Liberals, who lost 15 and 11 seats respectively, reducing them from 42% of seats between them to 33%.  The far left À gauche toute! lost most of its seats.  The Christian Democrats, Green Liberals, and Federal Democratic Union formed a heterogeneous centrist alliance called 'Alliance of the Centre', which won seven seats.

Results

|-
! style="background-color:#E9E9E9;text-align:left;" colspan=2 |Party
! style="background-color:#E9E9E9;text-align:left;" width=150px |Ideology
! style="background-color:#E9E9E9;text-align:right;" width=50px |Vote %
! style="background-color:#E9E9E9;text-align:right;" width=50px |Seats
! style="background-color:#E9E9E9;text-align:right;" width=50px |Seats ±
|-
| style="background-color: " |
| style="text-align:left;" | Social Democratic Party
| style="text-align:left;" | Social democracy
| style="text-align:right;" | 23.88
| style="text-align:right;" | 39
| style="text-align:right;" | –7
|-
| style="background-color: " |
| style="text-align:left;" | Free Democratic Party
| style="text-align:left;" | Classical liberalism
| style="text-align:right;" | 19.05
| style="text-align:right;" | 29
| style="text-align:right;" | –15
|-
| style="background-color: " |
| style="text-align:left;" | Swiss People's Party
| style="text-align:left;" | National conservatism
| style="text-align:right;" | 14.44
| style="text-align:right;" | 26
| style="text-align:right;" | +4
|-
| style="background-color: " |
| style="text-align:left;" | Green Party
| style="text-align:left;" | Green politics
| style="text-align:right;" | 16.94
| style="text-align:right;" | 24
| style="text-align:right;" | +1
|-
| width=5px style="background-color: " |
| style="text-align:left;" | Liberal Party
| style="text-align:left;" | Classical liberalism
| style="text-align:right;" | 14.09
| style="text-align:right;" | 20
| style="text-align:right;" | –11
|-
|
| style="text-align:left;" | Alliance of the Centre1
| style="text-align:left;" | Centrism
| style="text-align:right;" | 4.72
| style="text-align:right;" | 7
| style="text-align:right;" | +51
|-
| style="background-color: " |
| style="text-align:left;" | À gauche toute!
| style="text-align:left;" | Socialism
| style="text-align:right;" | 6.87
| style="text-align:right;" | 5
| style="text-align:right;" | –7
|- style="background: #E9E9E9"
! style="text-align:left;" colspan=3| Total (turnout 39.66%)
| style="text-align:right;" |  100.00
| 150
| style="text-align:right;" | –30
|-
| colspan=8 style="text-align:left;" | 1 Consisted of PDC, Green Liberals, UDF, and Riviera Libre.  Result compared to Christian Democratic list in 2007.
|-
| colspan=8 style="text-align:left;" | Source: Canton of Vaud
|}

Footnotes

2007 elections in Switzerland
2007